Albanian Alliance is a political party in the Republic of Kosovo. They are in the Opposition Alliance Congress and support a minimal unification of Kosovo and Albania. Its leader is Lorik Sabriu.

See also
Politics of Kosovo
Political parties in Kosovo
Albanian nationalism in Kosovo
Albanian nationalist parties
Political parties in Kosovo